Dan Robinson (born 15 March 1947 in Warrnambool, Victoria, Australia) is a singer who fronted the second incarnation of Melbourne Sixties band, The Wild Cherries and was later a member of the vocal trio The Virgil Brothers.

He attended Melbourne Grammar School where he was a boarder and played the bass in the School Orchestra. He graduated from the Conservatorium of Music at the University of Melbourne with B. Mus (Composition).

Following his work with The Wild Cherries and The Virgil Brothers, in 1970 Robinson recorded a cover of Cat Stevens' recent song Wild World. The single was released under the name Fourth House and entered the charts nationally around Australia.

In the 1970s and 80s he played in his country band Hit & Run while he also worked as a session musician.

During the 1980s he moved to Tasmania and established a business making instruments. He is now a highly regarded Luthier based at Anglesea.

Robinson joined The Wild Cherries in 2002 when they reformed for a one-off concert at the Corner Hotel in Richmond.

References

External Links 
Dan Robinson's official website (archived)
Article on his career as a Country musician(Across Country magazine no.15 1980) (archived)
Photo of Dan in the Wild Cherries held by the State Library of Victoria

1947 births
Living people
People educated at Melbourne Grammar School
Australian male singers
Singers from Victoria (Australia)
Australian rock singers
Wild Cherries members
Musicians from Geelong